Zajdi, zajdi, jasno sonce ("Set, Set, O Clear Sun") is a contemporary Macedonian folk song written and composed by Aleksandar Sarievski in the style of newly composed folk. Different versions of the song are sung in other neighbouring Balkan countries.

Origins

Sarievski composed the melody and adapted the text from another source, saying:

Lyrics of the song

Cultural references
 Vocals from the song were used in the track Innocence Lost from Phutureprimitive's Searching for Beauty in the Darkest Places Pt 2 studio album.
The woodwind melody is used in the track "Message for the Queen" from the 300 Original Motion Picture Soundtrack.
A version of the song was featured in the soundtrack for Battlefield 1.

References

External links
 pesna.org: at least 9 different versions of the song, lyrics, Latin transliteration, English, French and German translation, mp3 download
 Zajdi, Zajdi performed by Aleksandar Sarievski
 Song as originally performed by Aleksandar Sarievski
 Video of the song performed by Macedonian singer Tose Proeski
 Video of the song performed by Bulgarian singer Iva Davidova
 Bulgarian singer Nikolina Chakardakova – Zajdi, zajdi...

Macedonian folk songs